The 2003 European Sevens Championship was a rugby sevens competition, with the final held in Heidelberg, Germany (16 / 17 August 2003). It was the second edition of the European Sevens championship. This event was organised by rugby's European governing body, the FIRA – Association of European Rugby (FIRA-AER).
In the final Portugal beat France 26 - 21.

Qualification
Nine one-day qualifying rugby sevens competitions took place in Amsterdam, Netherlands (17 May 2003), Prague, Czech Republic (24 May 2003), Lunel, France (24 May 2003), Sopot, Poland (31 May 2003), Makarska, Croatia (7 June 2003), Madrid, Spain (14 June 2003), Lisbon, Portugal (21 June 2003), Budapest, Romania (28 June 2002), and Tbilisi, Georgia (28 June 2003). Following these competitions twelve teams consisting of Georgia, France, Portugal, Germany, Scotland, Croatia, Romania, Ukraine, Poland, Spain, Czech Republic, and Netherlands were deemed to have qualified for the European Sevens Championship hosted in Heidelberg, Germany (16-17 August 2003). However, before the tournament commenced Scotland withdrew and Switzerland replaced them.

Heidelberg

Pool Stage

Pool A

Pool B

Knockout stage

Bowl

Plate

Cup

Standings

References

External links
 http://www.rugby7.com/st.asp?T=NET-2003
 http://www.rugby7.com/st.asp?T=FRA-2003
 http://www.rugby7.com/st.asp?T=CZE-2003
 http://www.rugby7.com/st.asp?T=POL-2003
 http://www.rugby7.com/st.asp?T=CRO-2004
 http://www.rugby7.com/st.asp?T=SPA-2003
 http://www.rugby7.com/st.asp?T=POR-2003
 http://www.rugby7.com/st.asp?T=TBL-2003
 http://www.rugby7.com/st.asp?T=HUN-2003
 http://www.rugby7.com/st.asp?T=GER-2003

2002
International rugby union competitions hosted by Germany
European
2003–04 in German rugby union
2003–04 in European rugby union